The Ministry of Higher Education (MOHE) is a ministry of the Government of Malaysia that is responsible for higher education, polytechnic, community college, student loan, accreditation, student volunteer. Its main office is in Putrajaya. The ministry was formed on 27 March 2004, merged back into the Ministry of Education on 14 May 2013, but then reformed on 28 July 2015. After the 2018 general election, the ministry became a higher education division under the MOE. In the Muhyiddin cabinet, the higher education division was separated again from Ministry of Education to form as ministry since 10 March 2020.

Organisation
Minister of Higher Education
Deputy Minister of Higher Education
Secretary-General
Under the Authority of Secretary-General
Deputy Secretary-General (Development)
Deputy Secretary-General (Management)

Federal departments
 Department of Higher Education (DHE), or Jabatan Pendidikan Tinggi (JPT). (Official site)
 Department of Polytechnic Education (DPE), or Jabatan Pengajian Politeknik (JPP). (Official site)
 Department of Community Colleges Education (DCCE), or Jabatan Pengajian Kolej Komuniti (JPKK). (Official site)

Federal agencies
 National Higher Education Fund Corporation, or Perbadanan Tabung Pendidikan Tinggi Nasional (PTPTN). (Official site)
 Malaysian Qualifications Agency (MQA), or Agensi Kelayakan Malaysia. (Official site)
 Student Volunteer Foundation, or Yayasan Sukarelawan Siswa (YSS). (Official site)

Key legislation
The Ministry of Higher Education is responsible for administration of several key Acts:

Background
The functions of the MOHE was originally within the purview of the Ministry of Education (MOE) until the departments and agencies responsible for higher education were separated from the MOE on 27 March 2004 and established as a full ministry under a Federal Minister. In 2013, Prime Minister Najib Razak merged the Ministry of Education and the Ministry of Higher Education into a single Ministry of Education. In 2015, the Ministry is reestablished.

Organisation
The MOHE is headed by the Minister of Higher Education, a post held by Noraini Ahmad (UMNO). She is assisted by Deputy Minister Mansor Othman.

The following departments and agencies are under the purview of the MOHE:

Department of Higher Education
Also known by its Malay acronym, JPT (for Jabatan Pendidikan Tinggi), the department was headed by a Director General, Datin Paduka Ir. Dr. Siti Hamisah Binti Tapsir. This department was responsible for the management of both public and private institutes of higher learning and also Malaysian Student Department around the world.

Department of Polytechnic Education
Also known by its Malay acronym, JPP (for Jabatan Pengajian Politeknik), the department was headed by a Director General, YBhg. Datuk Hj Mohlis Bin Jaafar. This department was responsible for the management of polytechnics.

Department of Community Colleges
Also known by its Malay abbreviation, JPKK (for Jabatan Pengajian Kolej Komuniti), the department was headed by a Director General, Asc. Prof. Kamarudin Kasim. This department was responsible for the management of community colleges.

Malaysian Qualifications Agency
The Malaysian Qualifications Agency or MQA is a statutory body in Malaysia set up to accredit academic programs provided by educational institutions providing post secondary or higher education and facilitate the recognition and articulation of qualifications.

Perbadanan Tabung Pendidikan Tinggi Nasional
Better known as PTPTN, this agency provides education loans as a form of financial assistance to students with financial needs to aid them in pursuing a higher education. PTPTN also manages a students savings scheme for higher education purposes.

Tunku Abdul Rahman Foundation
The foundation is named after the first Prime Minister of Malaysia and founder of the foundation, Tunku Abdul Rahman. It provides scholarships for students to pursue a higher education. Students who are awarded the scholarships are known as Tunku Scholars.

Yayasan Sukarelawan Siswa/ Student Volunteers Foundation
The foundation ( (YSS) / Student Volunteers Foundation) was launched in 2012 as wholly owned entity of the Ministry of Education (MoE). Holding the vision to develop Malaysia as students’ volunteer hub and produce global student volunteer icons, YSS is determined to carry out its mission to encourage, educate and guide the students of higher learning institutions to promote world peace and inculcate the spirit of camaraderie through community engagement within and outside the country.

Public universities
The MOHE also has oversight responsibility for all the public universities in Malaysia.

See also
 Minister of Higher Education (Malaysia)
 Deputy Minister of Higher Education (Malaysia)
 Education in Malaysia

References

External links
 
 Scholarship in malaysia
 Top scholarships in malaysia

 
Former federal ministries, departments and agencies of Malaysia